Embroidery software is software that helps users create embroidery designs. While a large majority of embroidery software is specific to machine embroidery, there is also software available for use with hand embroidery, such as cross-stitch..

Comparison of embroidery software

Notes

References

Embroidery software
Embroidery equipment